Fernand Renault (28 November 1864, Paris – 22 March 1909, Paris) was one of the brothers that founded Renault, the French automobile manufacturer, in 1899.

References 

French founders of automobile manufacturers
1865 births
1909 deaths
Renault people
Automotive businesspeople